Shir Shotor or Shir Shutur may refer to:
 Shir Shotor, South Khorasan